"Wanted You More" is a song recorded by American country music trio Lady Antebellum.  It was released in May 2012 as the fourth single from their album Own the Night.  The song was written by group members Hillary Scott, Charles Kelley, and Dave Haywood, along with Matt Billingslea (their original drummer), Dennis Edwards (their bass player), Jonathan Long (their keyboardist and band leader) and Jason Gambill (one of their electric guitar players), and it features lead vocals from both Scott and Kelley.

Content
The song is about a relationship that is coming to an end, with the narrator realizing that her lover is not reciprocating the feelings of love. Charles Kelley and Hillary Scott said that they based the song around a melody that their touring band was improvising during a sound check.

Music video
The music video directed by Noble Jones was released on June 29, 2012 on Lady Antebellum's official Vevo.

Chart performance
"Wanted You More" debuted at number 57 on the Hot Country Songs chart dated May 26, 2012. It ultimately peaked at number 20 in September, making it Lady Antebellum's first single to miss the Top Ten since "Lookin' for a Good Time" peaked at number 11 in late 2008, and their lowest-charting single to date. On the Canadian Country Airplay chart, the song fared slightly better, peaking at number 10 in August 2012.

Year-end charts

References

2012 singles
2011 songs
Lady A songs
Songs written by Hillary Scott
Songs written by Charles Kelley
Songs written by Dave Haywood
Song recordings produced by Paul Worley
Capitol Records Nashville singles
Country ballads